A ceremonial pole is a stake or post utilised or venerated as part of a ceremony or religious ritual. Ceremonial poles may symbolize a variety of concepts in different ceremonies and rituals practiced by a variety of cultures around the world. In many cultures, ceremonial poles represent memorials and gravemarkers. In The Evolution of the Idea of God, Grant Allen notes that Samoyeds of Siberia, and Damara of South Africa plant stakes at the graves of ancestors. Ceremonial poles may also be raised during celebrations and festivals, as with Gudi Padwa in South Asia and the maypole dance in Europe. In some cultures they may represent sacred trees or tools wielded by deities. They may also symbolise the axis mundi or world tree. In religious ceremonies, they may be venerated as idols or representations of tutelary deities.

Asia

Middle East

Levant 

An Asherah pole is a sacred tree or pole that stood near Canaanite religious locations to honor the Ugaritic mother-goddess Asherah, consort of El.

The  were also cult objects related to the worship of the fertility goddess Asherah, the consort of either Ba'al or, as inscriptions from Kuntillet ‘Ajrud and Khirbet el-Qom attest, Yahweh, and thus objects of contention among competing cults. The insertion of "pole" begs the question by setting up unwarranted expectations for such a wooden object: "we are never told exactly what it was", observes John Day. Though there was certainly a movement against goddess-worship at the Jerusalem Temple in the time of King Josiah, it did not long survive his reign, as the following four kings "did what was evil in the eyes of Yahweh" (2 Kings 23:32, 37; 24:9, 19). Further exhortations came from Jeremiah. The traditional interpretation of the Biblical text is that the Israelites imported pagan elements such as the Asherah poles from the surrounding Canaanites. In light of archeological finds, however, modern scholars now theorize that the Israelite folk religion was Canaanite in its inception and always polytheistic, and it was the prophets and priests who denounced the Asherah poles who were the innovators; such theories inspire ongoing debate.

Mesopotamia 
According to Zelia Nuttall in The Fundamental Principles Of Old and New World Civilizations, tree and pole reverence to Anu in ancient Babylonia-Assyria  may have evolved from the fire drill and beam of the oil press, stating that it was extremely probable that the primitive employment of a fire-stick by the priesthood, for the production of "celestial fire," may have played an important role in causing the stick, and thence the pole and tree, to become the symbol of Anu.

Central Asia 
The Buryats and Yakuts of Siberia place hitching posts called  at the entrances to yurts or houses to indicate ownership and for shamanistic practices.

East Asia

China 
The Miao people in southwestern China raise ceremonial "flower poles" during the Huashan festival.

Korea 

A  or "village guardian" is a Korean ceremonial pole, usually made of wood. s were traditionally placed at the edges of villages to mark for village boundaries and frighten away demons. They were also worshipped as village tutelary deities.

South Asia 

Presently in the Indian subcontinent central poles are features of temple settings such as Hinglaj Mata (Sindh), Khambadev (Maharashtra), Nimad (Madhya Pradesh), Gogaji (Rajasthan), and Khambeshvari (Odisha). Ceremonial poles are also prominient in festivals, ceremonial dances, and celebrations such as Gudi Padwa, Kathi Kawadi, Jatara Kathi, and Nandi Dhwaja.

According to the Adi Parva, part of the Mahabharata, a bamboo festival named  was celebrated in the Chedi Kingdom. Uparichara Vasu was a king of Chedi belonging to the Puru dynasty, and he was known as the friend of Indra. During his reign, his kingdom introduced the  festival, which involved planting of a bamboo pole every year in honour of Indra, after which the king prayed for the expansion of his cities and kingdom. After erecting the pole, the celebrants decorated it with golden cloth, scents, garlands, and various ornaments.

Southest Asia

Myanmar 
Kay Htoe Boe is a Karenni ritual dance and prayer festival, held by the men in the Kayan community in Myanmar (Burma). In the Kayan creation story, the Eugenia tree is the first tree in the world. Kay Htoe Boe poles are usually made from the Eugenia tree.

Kay Htoe Boe poles have four levels, named for the stars, sun and moon, and the fourth level is a ladder made with a long white cotton cloth.

Europe 

A maypole is a tall wooden pole erected as a part of various European folk festivals, around which a maypole dance often takes place.

The festivals may occur on May Day or Pentecost (Whitsun), although in some countries it is instead erected at Midsummer. In some cases the maypole is a permanent feature that is only utilised during the festival, although in other cases it is erected specifically for the purpose before being taken down again.

Primarily found within the nations of Germanic Europe and the neighbouring areas which they have influenced, its origins remain unknown, although it has been speculated that it originally had some importance in the Germanic paganism of Iron Age and early Medieval cultures, and that the tradition survived Christianisation, albeit losing any original meaning that it had. It has been a recorded practice in many parts of Europe throughout the Medieval and Early Modern periods, although became less popular in the 18th and 19th centuries. Today, the tradition is still observed in some parts of Europe and among European communities in North America.

The fact that they were found primarily in areas of Germanic Europe, where, prior to Christianisation, Germanic paganism was followed in various forms, has led to speculation that the maypoles were in some way a continuation of a Germanic pagan tradition. One theory holds that they were a remnant of the Germanic reverence for sacred trees, as there is evidence for various sacred trees and wooden pillars that were venerated by the pagans across much of Germanic Europe, including Thor's Oak and the Irminsul. It is also known that, in Norse paganism, cosmological views held that the universe was a world tree, known as Yggdrasil.

The floor of the Mære Church, Norway, was excavated in 1969 and found to contain the remains of a pagan cult structure. The nature of that structure was not clear. Lidén felt this represented the remains of a building, but a critique by Olsen in the same work suggested this may have been a site for pole-related rituals. A recent review of the evidence by Walaker concluded that this site was similar to the site in Hove (Åsen, also in Nord-Trøndelag) and was therefore likely the site of a ceremonial pole.

Oceania 

In the Cook Islands Cult figures called staff-gods or atua rakau from Rarotonga, apparently combine images of gods with their human descendants. They range in length between 28 inches (71 cm) and 18 feet (5.5 m) and were carried and displayed horizontally.

See also

Notes

References

Works cited 

 
 
 
 
 
 
 
 
 
 
 
 
 
 
 
 
 
 
 
 
 
 
 
 
 
 
 
 
 

Anthropology of religion
Religious objects
Worship